The following is a list of international organization leaders in 2015.

UN organizations

Political and economic organizations

Financial organizations

Sports organizations

Other organizations

See also
List of state leaders in 2015
List of religious leaders in 2015
List of international organization leaders in 2014
List of international organization leaders in 2016

References

2015
2015 in international relations
Lists of office-holders in 2015